Cringila is a southern suburb of the city of Wollongong, New South Wales, Australia.  The suburb is bounded by Berkeley, Unanderra, Lake Heights and Warrawong.

The suburb is planned on a north-south residential/commercial strip and the east west streets that adjoin it, making a rectangular pattern.

Cringila Community Park is a 78 ha site purchased by Wollongong City Council after residents defeated a proposal by BHP to use the land as a dump for industrial waste. Its main purpose is to regenerate the local area's natural wildlife.  Surrounding Cringila's primary school is a protected rain forest.

A fraction of Cringila is the Port Kembla steelworks, which is a major local employer. This led to an influx of ethnic groups, primarily Macedonian, Portuguese, Turks and Lebanese. This in turn transformed the demographics of Cringila significantly and at the  more people lived in households where Macedonian was spoken (31.8%) than in households where only English was spoken (24.6%), making it the only suburb in Australia where this was true. However, at the  only 18.5% of the population lived in households where Macedonian was spoken and 40.2% lived in households where only English was spoken.

History

The word Cringila is an Aboriginal name - the town was formerly called Steeltown. In 1928 the first blast furnace opened up at the Port Kembla steelworks.

In 1935 the first public school opened, it was known as Steel Town School.  In 1957 Cringila Public School opened.

Shopping

The main operating shops include Abdul's Butcher, the Cringila Hotel, a few burek shops, a newsagency, a pharmacy and convenience store. Other businesses include a petrol station, kebab shops, and a florist.

Sport
Cringila also has a local football (soccer) team which participates in the local Illawarra Premier League. They are supported strongly by the Macedonian community of Cringila and Wollongong. They play their local games at their home ground at John Crehan Park, Merrett Avenue, Cringila. In 2008 Cringila had finished 4th in the local Illawarra Premier League and also won the Corrimal League cup which also led to greater success in winning the Bert Bampton Cup. Cringila Lions have a strong rivalry with Wollongong United also backed heavily by the Macedonian community.

Transport
Cringila railway station in on the Port Kembla Branch of the South Coast railway line.

Demographics

Their country of birth was as follows:

40.2% of people spoke only English at home. Other languages spoken at home included Macedonian 18.5% and Arabic 16.1%. The most common responses for religion were Islam 23.5%, Catholic 16.7%, Eastern Orthodox 14.9%, No Religion 14.0% and Christian, not further defined 8.1%.

See also
 Macedonian Australian

References

Macedonian-Australian culture
Suburbs of Wollongong